Yagoonya is a coastal locality in the Shire of Carpentaria, Queensland, Australia.

Geography
Yangoonya is on the west coast of the Cape York Peninsula facing the Gulf of Carpentaria. The Burke Developmental Road passes through the locality from north to south.

History 
Originally called Yagoona, the name was changed to Yagoonya on 7 June 2002.

Education 
There are no schools in Yagoonya. The nearest schools are in Kowanyama (P-10) to the north or in Normanton (P-10) and Karumba (P-6) to the south-west. There is no secondary Years 11 and 12 schooling available in the area or nearby.

References 

Shire of Carpentaria
Coastline of Queensland
Localities in Queensland